Parliamentary elections were held in the Grand Duchy of Finland on 2 and 3 January 1911.

Results

References

General elections in Finland
Finland
Parliamentary
Finland
Election and referendum articles with incomplete results